Curtis Lee Main (born 20 June 1992) is an English professional footballer who plays as a striker for Scottish Premiership club St Mirren.

Main previously played in the Football League and the Football Conference for Darlington, and spent three seasons with Middlesbrough, from where he had a loan spell at Shrewsbury Town in 2013. He then joined Doncaster Rovers, and after a loan spell at Oldham Athletic in 2016, he signed for Portsmouth, whom he helped gain promotion to League One. He joined Motherwell in January 2018.

Career

Darlington
Main was born in South Shields, Tyne and Wear. He attended St Mary's Church of England school in Tyne Dock, South Shields. He began his football career as a youngster at Sunderland before being released to League Two club Darlington, for whom he made his senior debut as a substitute in the last seven minutes of the game against Peterborough United on 3 May 2008. At 15 years 318 days, he became the youngest player to play for Darlington. In February 2009, he scored his first goal, the 86th-minute winner in a match against Grimsby Town, only two minutes after entering the game as a substitute. In May 2009, Main spent a week on trial with Premier League club Fulham, but the club preferred to monitor the player's progress rather than make an offer. Other clubs reported to be interested included Middlesbrough and Newcastle United. In September 2009, Main scored an 81st-minute equaliser against Grimsby Town, in a match that ended 1–1 and saw Darlington manager Colin Todd leave his post shortly after the final whistle.

In the early part of the 2010–11 season, Main had trials with Bury. In April 2011, after his contract was paid up by Darlington and he left the club, he joined Hartlepool United on trial.

Middlesbrough
After a trial with Middlesbrough, Main joined the Championship club on 12 May 2011, signing a one-year contract with an option for a second year. Manager Tony Mowbray described him as "a powerful lad", and said they intended to "mould him into a first-team player over the next couple of years". He made his debut on 4 February 2012, replacing Marvin Emnes in the 50th minute of a 0–0 draw with Crystal Palace, and his first start four days later, in a 2–1 defeat to Sunderland in the fourth round of the FA Cup. He scored his first goal for the club on 21 February, coming off the bench to score in a 3–1 win away to Millwall. On 14 April, he scored a late goal in a 1–0 win against Derby County. On 9 February 2013, he scored his first goal of the 2012–13 season on his third appearance, in a 3–2 loss to Barnsley. Three days later, he scored in the 81st minute of a 1–0 win over Leeds United, but within minutes was sent off after receiving two yellow cards for kicking the ball away and deliberate handball.

According to Mowbray, Main "came here on trial and trained with the youth team and you could see the power and speed he's got. His finishing with both feet is breathtaking at times. Whether the ball drops to his right foot or left foot, he doesn't hesitate. ... Physicality isn't going to be an issue for Curtis throughout his career. He's a boy who spends a lot of time looking after his physique and he's very, very strong."

Loan to Shrewsbury Town
On 30 August 2013, Main joined League One club Shrewsbury Town on loan for an initial month. He made his Shrewsbury debut the following day as a substitute against Coventry City and provided the assist for Tom Bradshaw in a 1–1 draw. His loan period was not extended, and he returned to Middlesbrough on 3 October having made six appearances for Shrewsbury in all competitions.

Doncaster Rovers
On 30 July 2014, Main signed a three-year contract with League One club Doncaster Rovers. The transfer was part of the deal by which James Husband joined Middlesbrough from Doncaster for an undisclosed fee.

Loan to Oldham
Main joined Oldham Athletic of League One on 15 February 2016 on loan until the end of the season. In March, Doncaster attempted to recall Main, but all parties had to agree on his return, and Main refused. With Oldham and Doncaster both trying to avoid relegation to League Two, Doncaster manager Darren Ferguson considered Main's decision "unfortunate". After Main helped Oldham stay up while his parent club did not, he was transfer-listed at the end of the season.

Portsmouth
On 4 July 2016, Main signed a two-year contract with League Two club Portsmouth. The fee was undisclosed. He scored his first goal for Portsmouth on his debut, in a 3–2 EFL Cup loss against Coventry City on 9 August, and continued as a regular member of the matchday squad, scoring 5 goals from 14 appearances, before back and hamstring problems put paid to his season. After Portsmouth gained promotion to League One as League Two champions, Main played little, unable to dislodge Brett Pitman and Ollie Hawkins from the starting eleven, and in January 2018 he was allowed to leave by mutual consent.

Motherwell
Main joined Scottish Premiership club Motherwell on 3 January 2018 on an 18-month deal. He made his debut for Motherwell on 20 January, in a 2–0 win against Hamilton Academical in the Scottish Cup. His first goal for the club came in a 2–0 win at home to Ross County. He followed this up with goals in his next two matches, away to Heart of Midlothian and Hibernian. On 14 April 2018, Main scored twice in a Scottish Cup semi-final as Motherwell beat Aberdeen 3–0 to reach their second cup final of the season.

Aberdeen
On 5 June 2019, Main joined fellow Scottish Premiership club Aberdeen on a two-year deal.

Shrewsbury Town
Main joined English League One club Shrewsbury Town on 1 February 2021 until the end of the season. He scored his first goal on 23 February in a 4-2 win over MK Dons, and scored twice from 20 league matches before leaving the club following the expiry of his contract.

St Mirren
Main returned to Scotland and signed a two-year deal with Scottish Premiership club St Mirren on 7 June 2021.

Career statistics

Honours
Portsmouth
EFL League Two: 2016–17

References

External links
Curtis Main profile at the Portsmouth F.C. website

1992 births
Living people
Footballers from South Shields
English footballers
Association football forwards
Darlington F.C. players
Middlesbrough F.C. players
Shrewsbury Town F.C. players
Doncaster Rovers F.C. players
Oldham Athletic A.F.C. players
Portsmouth F.C. players
Motherwell F.C. players
St Mirren F.C. players
English Football League players
National League (English football) players
Scottish Professional Football League players